KBTQ (96.1 FM) is a radio station broadcasting a   Latin ballad format. Licensed to Harlingen, Texas, United States, the station serves the McAllen area. The station is currently owned by Latino Media Network; under a local marketing agreement, it is programmed by former owner TelevisaUnivision's Uforia Audio Network.

History
KMBS "Stereo 96" signed on the air in June 1975. The English-language adult contemporary station was owned by Magic Valley Broadcasting, Inc. Two years later, in July 1977, Pedro "Pete" Díaz, Jr., bought out all of Magic Valley's stockholders. In early 1977, KMBS became a Spanish contemporary radio station; On July 20, the station received new KIWW call letters. Tichenor acquired KIWW in 1988.

KIWW carried a Tejano format until 2002, when it flipped to Rhythmic Top 40 as KBTQ. As this flipped occurred, the call letters "KIWW" remained in radio jingles and sweepers for a brief amount of time until the switch to the call letters of KBTQ. 

During the time of KBTQ 96.1 The Beat, shows that were broadcast included:

"The Slammin' 7 at 7:47 (PM),"
"Heartbeats on Sundays,"
"Morning Show with Alex Q. and Nicki,"
"Back in the Day with Kitty,"
"Sexy 7 at 7 (PM),"
"Bobby's Playhouse with Chatito."

Two years into this format, KBTQ gained formidable competition when KBFM switched from Mainstream Top 40 to Rhythmic Top 40, sparking a Rhythmic war in the Valley.

Loss of Revenue 2005
As the Rhythmic War continued with rival KBFM, 96.1 The Beat KBTQ failed to capitalize on advertisement of commercial revenue due to various businesses' preference for a cleaner-sounding KBFM rather than an intense urban leaning station from KBTQ. Former personalities of KBTQ switched over to rival KBFM by this time and it was apparent that revenue was not improving thus forcing Univision to pay out its personalities through sister station advertising commercial revenues. Although the listener ratings were strong and in favor of KBTQ against rival KBFM, the incoming revenue or lack thereof said otherwise. Univision came to the terms that without business advertising commercials, there is no way to maintain a station with its format.

Format Change 2005
On October 17, 2005, KBTQ bowed out and switched to its current format to appeal to a wide range of businesses for commercial advertisement.

References

External links

BTQ
BTQ
Harlingen, Texas